Alberto Andrés González Paredes (born 1980) is a Chilean former professional footballer who played as a midfielder for clubs in Chile, Mexico, Vietnam and Indonesia.

Career
Born in Osorno, Chile, in March 1998 González joined Boca Juniors along with his fellow Marco Bahamonde, where they coincided with players such as Sebastián Battaglia, Juan Román Riquelme, Martín Palermo, among others. He played for the reserve team until 2000 before returning to Chile. He has been one of the few Chilean players who have were with Boca Juniors.

In Chile, he played for Provincial Osorno, with a stint on loan at Iberia. As a member of Provincial Osorno, he won a qualifier for the 2003 Copa Sudamericana and, once in the tournament, took part in a notorious match against Universidad Católica, where the referee  was thoroughly criticized.

Then he moved abroad again to play in Mexico, Vietnam and Indonesia, where he played for Sriwijaya Palembang, PSLS Lhokseumawe and Gaspa Palopo.

He retired in 2009.

Personal life
González is also known by his nickname Charly and has went on playing football at amateur level after his retirement along with Marco Bahamonde, in clubs such as Municipal from Osorno.

Honours
Provincial Osorno
 :

References

External links
 
 Alberto González at playmakerstats.com (English version of ceroacero.es)
 

1980 births
Living people
People from Osorno, Chile
Chilean footballers
Chilean expatriate footballers
Boca Juniors footballers
Provincial Osorno footballers
Deportes Iberia footballers
PSLS Lhokseumawe players
Sriwijaya F.C. players
Argentine Primera División players
Chilean Primera División players
Tercera División de Chile players
Primera B de Chile players
Indonesian Premier Division players
Chilean expatriate sportspeople in Argentina
Chilean expatriate sportspeople in Mexico
Chilean expatriate sportspeople in Vietnam
Chilean expatriate sportspeople in Indonesia
Expatriate footballers in Argentina
Expatriate footballers in Mexico
Expatriate footballers in Vietnam
Expatriate footballers in Indonesia
Association football midfielders
Date of birth missing (living people)